Jhamu Sughand (1951 – 26 May 2008) was an Indian film financier, producer and distributor, in mainstream Bollywood, as well parallel cinema. He is most known as producer of Academy Award-nominated Lagaan (2001), Satya (1998), Hum Dil De Chuke Sanam (1999), Aks (2001) and  Bombay (1995).

He started Jhamu Sughand Productions, also produced films in Marathi and Bengali, and was awarded the 2000 National Film Award for Best Feature Film in Marathi as the producer of Astitva directed by Mahesh Manjrekar, and subsequently National Film Award for Best Feature Film for Kaalpurush directed by Buddhadeb Dasgupta.

Career
Sughand started his career joining his family cloth trading business in Deolali, his hometown, and in 1979 he moved to Mumbai. Here started a printing press specialising in film merchandise for some years, before shifting to film distribution in 1988. In the coming years, he distributed over 100 films, but it was Mani Ratnam's, Bombay (1995) which first got him acclaim.

In later years, he stopped producing films, eventually selling one of his last films, Gulaal directed by Anurag Kashyap, which was eventually released in 2009.

He died on 26 May 2008, of cardiac arrest at the age of 57. He had suffered a brain stroke a few days earlier. He is survived by his wife, son and daughter.

Filmography

Producer

 Rangeela (1995)
 Bombay (1995, Tamil)
 Hindustani (1996, Tamil)
 Daud (1997) 
 Chachi 420 (1997)
 Earth (1998, executive producer)
 Hum Dil De Chuke Sanam (1999)
 Khoobsurat (1999) 
 Astitva (2000, Marathi)
 Lagaan (2001)
 Aks (2001) 
 Filhaal... (2002) 
 Hum Kisise Kum Nahin (2002)
 Swapner Din (2004, Bengali) 
 Kalpurush (2005, Bengali)
 Secrets and Lies (2007, Documentary) 
 Janmadata (2008, Bengali)

Distributor
 Black Friday (2007)
 Janmadata (2008, Bengali)

Awards
 National Film Awards
 2000 Best Feature Film in Marathi (producer): Astitva  
 2005: Best Feature Film (producer): Kaalpurush 
 IIFA Awards
 2000: Best Movie (producer): Hum Dil De Chuke Sanam

References

External links
 

2008 deaths
1951 births
Film producers from Mumbai
Hindi film producers
Indian film distributors
People from Nashik district
Tamil film producers
Bengali film producers
Marathi film producers
Producers who won the Best Feature Film National Film Award